Lars Göran Ingemar Norén (9 April 1944 – 26 January 2021) was a Swedish playwright, novelist and poet. His plays are realistic and often revolve around family and personal relations, either among people who are impoverished and rooted at the bottom of society, or people who live in material comfort but emotional insecurity.

Career
His first publication was a collection of poems - Syrener, snö (Lilac, snow) in 1963. He was among the contributors of Puss satirical magazine in late 1960s.

Norén's play 7:3 became a centre of controversy, after the murders of two policemen in Malexander in 1999 (The Malexander murders). The culprits had received furloughs from their incarceration at Österåker Prison to participate in Norén's play.

He was a Sommarvärd on P1's "Sommar" on 19 June 2005.

Norén was director at Folkteatern in Gothenburg between 2009 and 2011.

Death
Norén died on 26 January 2021, at the age of 76, after suffering from COVID-19 during the COVID-19 pandemic in Sweden.

Awards

Norén received Aftonbladet's literary prize in 1971. In 2003, he won the Swedish Academy Nordic Prize, known as the 'little Nobel'.

Works

 Syrener, snö (1963)
 De verbala resterna av en bildprakt som förgår (1964)
 Inledning nr: 2 till SCHIZZ (1965)
 Encyklopedi (1966)
 Stupor. Nobody knows you when you're down and out (1968)
 Salome, Sfinxerna. Roman om en tatuerad flicka (1968)  
 Revolver (1969)
 Biskötarna (1970)
 I den underjordiska himlen (1972)
 Solitära dikter (1972)
 Kung Mej och andra dikter (1973)
 Dagliga och nattliga dikter (1974)
 Dagbok (1976)
 Nattarbete (1976)
 Order (1978)
 Murlod (1979)
 Den ofullbordade stjärnan (1979)
 Hjärta i hjärta (1980)
 Tre skådespel (1980)
 Två skådespel (1983)
 Endagsvarelser (1990)
 Och ge oss skuggorna (1991)
 Tre borgerliga kvartetter (1992)
 De döda pjäserna I-IV (1995)
 Personkrets 3:1 (The Human Circle 3:1) (1998)
 Skuggpojkarna (Shadow Boys) (1999)
 7:3 (1999)
 Salome, Sfiinxerna (2001)
 Stilla vatten (Still Water) (2002)
 Detaljer (Details) (2002)
 Kyla (Cold) (2003)
 Vinterförvaring (Winter Storage) (2003)
 Le 20 novembre (2006)

References

External links 
Art as an Underwater Bomb. A 42 minute interview with Lars Norén Video by Louisiana Channel
 
 
 Recordings of Lars Norén's productions in the Online Archive of the Österreichische Mediathek Retrieved 27. September 2022

1944 births
2021 deaths
Litteris et Artibus recipients
20th-century Swedish dramatists and playwrights
Sommar (radio program) hosts
Writers from Stockholm
Swedish male dramatists and playwrights
Deaths from the COVID-19 pandemic in Sweden
20th-century Swedish male writers
21st-century Swedish dramatists and playwrights
21st-century Swedish male writers